Ian Loveday, better known as Eon (22 September 1954 – 17 June 2009), was a British rave pioneer.

Born in 1954, Loveday was the son of violinist Alan Loveday and pianist Ruth Stanfield.

His tracks made their way to early 1990s pirate radio stations in London, and then out on vinyl through small labels like BAAD and Vinyl Solution. He released Void Dweller, with its dark and hard driving beats, on Columbia Records in September 1992; it used samples from David Lynch's Dune, The Outer Limits, and themes from the horror movie Basket Case.

His sound was a link between the early Detroit techno and contemporary dance music. In the early 1990s, this release was shared between DJs and musicians and was very influential. Eon was known for the acid techno song called "Spice" which was released in November 1990. Later in his career, he worked with Baby Ford and Bizarre Inc., and released singles on Trelik Records and Electron Industries.

Death
Loveday died on 17 June 2009 in London, of complications from pneumonia.

Discography

Albums
 Void Dweller (1992)
 Brain Filter (1998)
 Sum of Parts (2002)
 Device (2006)

EPs
 Spice (Vinyl Solution, 10" 45rpm, 1990)
 Fear: The Mindkiller (Vinyl Solution, 12" 33rpm, 1991)

References

External links
Official website maintained by friends and family
Detailed History @ Ian Loveday's MySpace.com page
 Eon on Discogs

1954 births
2009 deaths
British electronic musicians
Deaths from pneumonia in England
Place of death missing
English people of New Zealand descent